Connie Galiwango Nakayenze (born on 31 August 1967) is a Ugandan politician and district woman representative of Mbale District in Uganda's eleventh Parliament. Connie also served as the Member of Parliament in the ninth Parliament of Uganda. She is affiliated to the ruling party, the National Resistance Movement.

Education and personal life 
She is a married woman. Connie sat for her Primary Leaving Examinations (PLE) in 1981 at Gangama Primary School. She later attained Grade III Teachers Certificate in 1989 from Kabwangasi Primary Teachers College and Uganda Advanced Certificate of Education (UACE) in 1992 from Mbale Hall. She also holds a Diploma in Secondary Education from National Teachers College, Nagongera (1995). In 2001, Connie was awarded Bachelor of Arts in Social Sciences from Islamic University in Uganda. This was followed by a Master of Arts in Education Management in 2008 from the same University.

Connie's hobbies are Volleyball, Music and Net Ball.

Career 
Connie was a teacher at Nabuyonga Primary School between 1989 and 1993 before serving as a teacher at Mbale S.S (1995–2003) and Mbale High School (2003–2011). Between 2011 and 2016, she joined the Parliament of Uganda as the member of parliament. Connie was also voted for the eleventh parliament of Uganda during the 2021 January elections in Uganda.

In Uganda's tenth Parliament, she serves as the Chairperson of the Committee on Education & Sports. Additionally, she serves as the member of the Committee on HIV/AIDS & Related Disease and member of Business Committee.

See also 

 Mbale District
 List of members of the eleventh Parliament of Uganda.
 List of members of the ninth Parliament of Uganda.
 List of members of the tenth Parliament of Uganda.

External links 

 Website of the Parliament of Uganda.
https://nrm.co.ug/staff/nakayenze-galiwango-connie/

References 

Living people
National Resistance Movement politicians
Women members of the Parliament of Uganda
Members of the Parliament of Uganda
Ugandan educators
1967 births
21st-century Ugandan politicians
21st-century Ugandan women politicians